Galerga hyposticta is a species of butterfly in the family Hesperiidae. It is found in eastern Madagascar. The habitat consists of forests.

References

Butterflies described in 1898
Astictopterini
Butterflies of Africa
Taxa named by Paul Mabille